"You Don't Wanna Miss" is the title of a R&B single by For Real. It was the first single from their debut album It's a Natural Thang.  Masters at Work remixes appeared on the Billboard dance chart in January 1995.

Tracklisting
Maxi-Promo CD

1.) You Don't Wanna Miss (Indasoul 7" w/ Acapella Intro) [3:56]
2.) You Don't Wanna Miss (Indasoul 7") [3:55]
3.) You Don't Wanna Miss (Silkadelic Radio 7") [4:19]
4.) You Don't Wanna Miss (LP Edit) [3:20]
5.) You Don't Wanna Miss (Real Raw Radio Edit) [4:05]
6.) You Don't Wanna Miss (Hip Hop For Real Mix) [3:52]
7.) You Don't Wanna Miss (Silkadelic 12") [4:56]

Chart positions

References

A&M Records singles
1994 debut singles
For Real songs
1994 songs